Delphinium californicum is a species of larkspur known as California larkspur. This wildflower is endemic to California, where it is a resident of the chaparral slopes of the San Francisco Bay Area and Central Coast.

It has a long root from which it erects tall stems, usually exceeding a meter in height and often approaching two meters. The leaves arise on long petioles and are each divided into as many as 15 fingerlike pointed lobes. The top of the stem is occupied with a very large inflorescence usually containing over 50 flowers.

Each flower rises on a pedicel several centimeters long. The sepals point forward to make a cup out of the mouth of the somewhat tubular flower. The longest sepals are about a centimeter long and the spur of the flower may approach two centimeters in length. The flower is generally white to greenish white to light lavender.

External links

Jepson Manual Treatment: Delphinium californicum
Delphinium californicum — U.C. Photo gallery

californicum
Endemic flora of California
Natural history of the California chaparral and woodlands
Natural history of the San Francisco Bay Area
Flora without expected TNC conservation status